Oleksandr Serhiyovych Sukhov (born 20 May 1984) is a Ukrainian politician currently serving as a People's Deputy of Ukraine from Ukraine's 107th electoral district since 29 August 2019. An independent, he is affiliated with the Dovira parliamentary group.

Early life and career 
Oleksandr Serhiyovych Sukhov was born on 20 May 1984 in the city of Stakhanov, Ukraine, then under the Soviet Union. He graduated from the Yaroslav Mudryi National Law University, and worked for over a decade as a prosecutor. In 2016, he was a prosecutor at the Kyiv Oblast prosecutor's office. Sukhov was additionally a managing partner at the Velmozhnyi and Partners law offices.

Political career 
Prior to his election as a People's Deputy of Ukraine, Sukhov was head of the Our Land party in Lysychansk, as well as an assistant to Serhii Shakhov, a People's Deputy in the 8th Ukrainian Verkhovna Rada (parliament).

Sukhov ran in the 2019 Ukrainian parliamentary election as an independent candidate for People's Deputy of Ukraine in Ukraine's 107th electoral district. He was successfully elected, winning 28.80% of the vote compared to the next-closest candidate (Oleksandr Sorokin of Servant of the People)'s 18.78% of the vote.

As a People's Deputy, Sukhov joined the Dovira parliamentary group on 6 December 2019. He is a member of the Verkhovna Rada Transport and Infrastructure Committee.

References 

1984 births
Living people
Ninth convocation members of the Verkhovna Rada
Our Land (Ukraine) politicians
People from Stakhanov, Ukraine
Yaroslav Mudryi National Law University alumni